Adrian Ang Hsien Loong is a Malaysian ten-pin bowler. He was born on 16 July 1988 in Penang. He bowls right handed with a 15lbs ball.

Career

He finished in 17th position of the combined rankings at the 2006 QubicaAMF Bowling World Cup. Amongst other successes, he won the Malaysian Open in 2010 as well as the Singapore Open in 2013. He has won major tournaments such as SEA Games, Asian Games, Asian Youth, etc.

References

Malaysian ten-pin bowling players
Living people
Asian Games medalists in bowling
Bowlers at the 2010 Asian Games
Bowlers at the 2014 Asian Games
Bowlers at the 2018 Asian Games
Asian Games gold medalists for Malaysia
Asian Games silver medalists for Malaysia
Medalists at the 2010 Asian Games
Medalists at the 2014 Asian Games
1988 births
Southeast Asian Games gold medalists for Malaysia
Southeast Asian Games silver medalists for Malaysia
Southeast Asian Games bronze medalists for Malaysia
Southeast Asian Games medalists in bowling
Competitors at the 2011 Southeast Asian Games
Competitors at the 2015 Southeast Asian Games
Competitors at the 2017 Southeast Asian Games
Competitors at the 2009 World Games
World Games bronze medalists
World Games medalists in bowling